Midwest Division may refer to:
 Midwest Division (NBA)
 Midwest Division (OHL)